Metafruticicola berytensis is a species of gastropod belonging to the family Hygromiidae.

The species is found in Mediterranean.

References

Hygromiidae